Richard Steiner may refer to:

 Rick Steiner (producer) (1946–2016), Broadway producer
 Richard C. Steiner (born 1945), Semitist